Hungary competed at the 1960 Winter Olympics in Squaw Valley, United States.

Biathlon

Men

 1 Two minutes added per missed target.

Cross-country skiing

Men

Women

Ski jumping

References
Official Olympic Reports
International Olympic Committee results database
 Olympic Winter Games 1960, full results by sports-reference.com

Nations at the 1960 Winter Olympics
1960
Olympics